Surendran a/l Ravindran (born 17 May 1987) is a Malaysian football player who plays as a winger.

Surendran began his football career by joining Pahang first team when he was just 19 for under 21 quota. Initially, he played as striker before he converted to midfielder by coach Dollah Salleh.

Style of play
Pahang fans considers Suren an incredibly quick player and one of the fastest in the team, with excellent skill on the ball and a keen eye for a pass and cross ball.

Career statistics

Club

Honours

Club
Pahang
 Malaysia Cup (2): 2013, 2014
 FA Cup (1): 2014
 Malaysian Charity Shield (1): 2014

Melaka United
 Malaysia Premier League (1): 2016

References

External links
 Dua 'R' berkorban demi Piala Malaysia
 Suren, Gopi azam beraksi cemerlang
 Surendran sedia rebut kembali tempat
 Surendran kesal sepak Daudsu
 Surendran penyelamat
 Tok Gajah ikat Selangor
 we can be among top three
 Dollah enggan dabik dada
 PEMAIN LIGA SUPER PAHANG 2009

Malaysian footballers
1987 births
Living people
People from Pahang
Sri Pahang FC players
Malaysia Super League players
Malaysian people of Tamil descent
Malaysian sportspeople of Indian descent
Association football wingers
Melaka United F.C. players